Olivier van Deuren or Olivier Pietersz. van Deuren; Olivier van Dueren; Olivier van Durren (December 21, 1666 – February 10, 1714) was a painter from the Northern Netherlands.

Deuren was born in Rotterdam and became a pupil of Peter Lely, Frans van Mieris the Elder and Caspar Netscher. He is known for genre works and figure studies.

Deuren died in Rotterdam.

References

External links

 

1666 births
1714 deaths
17th-century Dutch painters
18th-century Dutch painters
18th-century Dutch male artists
Painters from Rotterdam
Dutch male painters